George Michael Ford (January 7, 1871 – August 21, 1941) was an American college football player and coach and education administrator.

Playing and coaching career
Ford was a member of the first football team at West Virginia University in 1891.

Ford served as the head football coach and head baseball coach from 1903 to 1904 at Marshall University in Huntington, West Virginia. He was the school's first football coach.

Education career
From 1897 to 1900, Ford was the principal of Concord College, now known as Concord University, in Athens, West Virginia.

Ford was a superintendent at various school's across the state of West Virginia, including Bluefield, Beaver Pond, Brown's Creek, and Dunbar. He was also a principal at Terra Alta, Grafton, and Benwood.

Ford served as the West Virginia State Superintendent of Schools from 1921 to 1929.

Head coaching record

Football

References

1871 births
1941 deaths
19th-century American educators
19th-century players of American football
20th-century American educators
Concord University faculty
Marshall Thundering Herd baseball coaches
Marshall Thundering Herd football coaches
West Virginia Republicans
West Virginia Mountaineers football players
West Virginia University College of Law alumni
People from Barbour County, West Virginia
Coaches of American football from West Virginia
Players of American football from West Virginia
Baseball coaches from West Virginia